Yashira Lebrón Rodríguez (born July 24, 1981) is a politician from Puerto Rico and current legislator for District 8 in the 29th House of Representatives of Puerto Rico. Lebrón filled the vacancy left by Antonio "Toñito" Silva after Silva resigned from his position.

Early years and studies
She possesses a bachelor's degree in political science from the University of Puerto Rico and a master's degree in criminal justice from the Interamerican University of Puerto Rico.

Political life

She served two term in the Municipal Assembly of Bayamon and was the vice-president of the Municipal Legislature of Bayamon. On October 23, 2014, she replaced Antonio "Toñito" Silva for his seat as the representative for District 8th. She was reelected in the 2016 General Election. Lebrón Rodríguez is currently the president of the House of Representatives of Puerto Rico Commission on Consumer, Banking and Insurance Affairs.

References

Living people
Interamerican University of Puerto Rico alumni
Members of the House of Representatives of Puerto Rico
People from Bayamón, Puerto Rico
1981 births
21st-century American women politicians
21st-century American politicians
Puerto Rican women in politics